The 2012–13 Ottawa Senators season was the 21st season of the Ottawa Senators of the National Hockey League (NHL). The regular season was reduced from its usual 82 games to 48 due to a lockout. Despite having a large number of injuries, the Senators qualified for the Stanley Cup playoffs, defeating the Montreal Canadiens in the first round before being eliminated by the Pittsburgh Penguins in the second round.

After 19 years, this season marked the end of the Daniel Alfredsson era. Before signing with the Detroit Red Wings the following season, Alfredsson has been the Senators' team captain since 1999 and is believed by many as the greatest Senator of all-time. As captain, Alfredsson led his team to 11 playoff appearances and one Stanley Cup Finals appearance in 2007.

Off-season
At the 2012 NHL Entry Draft, the Senators selected local Orleans, Ontario, and Ottawa 67's player Cody Ceci in the first round, 15th overall. The pick was the first first-round pick of a 67's player by the team.

The Senators' roster was not changed substantially during the summer. The Senators lost forward Zenon Konopka and defencemen Filip Kuba and Matt Carkner to other teams through free agency. The team traded forward Nick Foligno to the Columbus Blue Jackets for defenceman Marc Methot to add to the defence. The team picked up winger Guillaume Latendresse and defenceman Mike Lundin through free agency, both from the Minnesota Wild. Later in the summer, the team bought-out winger Bobby Butler and he signed with the New Jersey Devils.

The team made re-signing Norris Trophy winner and potential restricted free agent Erik Karlsson a priority, and he signed a seven-year extension with the team. The team reached agreement on contract extensions with Chris Neil, Kyle Turris and Zack Smith. The club also re-signed Peter Regin, Kaspars Daugavins and Stephane Da Costa to one-year contracts.

Pre-season
On Tuesday, June 19, the Ottawa Senators announced a seven-game preseason. The schedule included three road contests in Montreal, Toronto and Winnipeg. Three home contests against Toronto, Montreal and a split-squad of the New York Islanders. There will also be one neutral site game taking place in Barrie, Ontario, against the other split-squad of the New York Islanders. These games were not played due to the lockout. No pre-season games were played as part of the revised season schedule.

Regular season
On June 21, the Ottawa Senators announced their 2012–13 regular season schedule. The Senators regular-season opener was to take place at the Bell Centre in Montreal against the Canadiens on Thursday, October 11. Their home-opener was to be played at Scotiabank Place on Saturday, October 13, against the Washington Capitals, with the Senators to close out their regular season at home on Saturday, April 13, against the Winnipeg Jets. However, this schedule was eventually abandoned due to the lockout. Once the lockout had been resolved, a revised schedule of 48 games was released on January 12, 2013. The Senators opened their season on January 19, 2013 in Winnipeg against the Jets. Their regular season concluded with a road game against the Boston Bruins on April 28.

 saw the Senators devastated with injuries throughout much of the season. Jason Spezza suffered a herniated disc and required back surgery, Milan Michalek underwent arthroscopic surgery on his right knee, league leading goaltender Craig Anderson injured his ankle when Chris Kreider of the New York Rangers slid into his leg, Jared Cowen had hip surgery, and Erik Karlsson had his achilles tendon cut by Pittsburgh's Matt Cooke. The play was reviewed by the NHL but no discipline or suspensions were handed out. Senators owner Eugene Melnyk commenced a private investigation into the conduct of Cooke. Despite being devastated by injury, the Senators continued to find ways to win games, earning the nickname Pesky Sens.

The Senators had solid goaltending, finishing the lockout-shortened regular season of 48 games with just 100 goals allowed (excluding four shootout goals against), the fewest in the League.

Playoffs
On April 25, after a 2–1 overtime victory over the Washington Capitals, the Ottawa Senators clinched a playoff berth for the 14th time in the modern franchise's history. This would also mark the first time the team clinched in back-to-back seasons since the 2006–07 and 2007–08 seasons and the first time the Senators made the playoffs while the New Jersey Devils missed the playoffs.

After the end of the season on April 28, Ottawa finished seventh, drawing the Montreal Canadiens in the first round of the playoffs. It was the first playoff series between Montreal and Ottawa since 1928, when the original Senators were defeated by the Montreal Maroons in a two-game, total goal playoff. The Canadiens played the original Senators in the 1927 playoffs.

Ottawa Senators (7) vs. Montreal Canadiens (2) 
The first game of the series was won by the Senators 4–2 in Montreal. During the game, Senators defenceman Eric Gryba checked Montreal center Lars Eller, causing a concussion and facial fractures. Gryba would be given a two-game suspension by the league for the hit. Montreal took 27 shots at Craig Anderson in the second period, and 50 overall. The Senators won the game on a three-goal third period, erasing a 2–1 deficit to win the game. Anderson lost a tooth on a shot off his mask, but continued and was named the game's first star. The 27 shots in the second against Anderson set a new playoff record by the Senators for shots allowed, and the Canadiens for shots taken.

In the second game, Montreal played without Eller and regulars Max Pacioretty and Brian Gionta. The Senators could not capitalize on the Canadiens missing the players and lost 3–1. Montreal goaltender Carey Price would be named the first star of the game. Like Anderson in the first game, Price would also lose a tooth and be named first star.

In the third game in Ottawa, Senators' rookie Jean-Gabriel Pageau scored his first NHL hat-trick; his first goal was the game-winner. On the goal, Pageau lost a tooth on a stick to the face, becoming the third consecutive first star to lose a tooth in the series. The Senators played a more physical style in the third game and focussed on wearing down the Canadiens' top defenceman P. K. Subban. Subban would be ineffective, recording more penalty minutes than playing time, before being ejected. The Senators broke the game open in the third, scoring four goals to win 6–1. After the Senators took a 4–1 lead, all players on the ice for both teams except the goaltenders fought. Eight players were ejected. The game tied or set several Senators' records: the four goals in the third period matched the record for most in a period; the two power-play goals in the period matched another record; the 16 penalties and 93 minutes taken by the Senators in the third set a new record; the 107 minutes of penalties during the game also set a new record. The margin of victory matched the highest by a Senators team in the playoffs, matching a 5–0 defeat of Toronto in the 2002 playoffs.

In game four, the teams stuck mostly to hockey: only four penalties were called, all minors. The first period was scoreless. In the second period, the Canadiens' Subban and Alex Galchenyuk scored to give the Canadiens a 2–0 lead into the third period. In the third period, the Canadiens played a tight defensive game, while the Senators pressed to equalize, out-shooting Montreal 13–4. Mika Zibanejad scored on a deflection off his skate. It was ruled on the ice and after video review to be a good goal. With 22 seconds left, and Anderson on the bench for an extra attacker, Cory Conacher scored to tie the game and force overtime. In the final seconds of the third period, Zibanejad shot on the Montreal net and the shot was deflected by Carey Price. However, on the shot Price was injured and was unable to play in overtime, his position taken by Peter Budaj. In overtime, Kyle Turris wristed a shot on net that was deflected by Canadiens' defenceman Raphael Diaz past Budaj. The goal won the game for the Senators 3–2 and the Senators took the series lead three games to one.

Two Canadiens could not play in game five at the Bell Centre: Price and Brian Gionta. The Senators scored twice in the first period before the Canadiens scored late to close the margin to 2–1 at the first intermission. The Senators restored their two-goal lead in the second on a controversial short-handed goal by Turris. Turris fell into the crease of Montreal goaltender Peter Budaj and the puck was shot on net and deflected in off Turris. It was ruled a good goal as Turris had been pushed into the net by a Montreal player. In the third period, the Senators scored three goals, finishing 6–1 and eliminating the Canadiens. For the series, the Senators did not allow a third period goal by the Canadiens in any game. It was also the first time that the Sens had won a playoff series since eliminating the Buffalo Sabres in game five of the 2007 Eastern Conference Final on May 19, 2007.

Ottawa Senators (7) vs. Pittsburgh Penguins (1) 
The Penguins defeated the New York Islanders in six games to advance to the Conference Semi-final versus the Senators. The Penguins won the final two games with backup goaltender Tomas Vokoun in net, and Vokoun drew the starting goaltender assignment for the second round.

In game one, the Penguins scored two power-play goals and a short-handed goal on way to a 4–1 win on home ice. In game two, Sidney Crosby scored a hat-trick and the Penguins held off a Senators comeback to win 4–3 and go ahead in the series two games to none going to Ottawa. Game three saw the return of Jason Spezza to the Senators' lineup after a long injury layoff due to back surgery. The Penguins very nearly took a three games to none lead in the series, but gave up a last-minute short-handed goal by Daniel Alfredsson which sent the game to overtime. The game was won in the second overtime on a goal by Colin Greening, his third of the series, on a rebound of an Andre Benoit shot. The Penguins won game four in Ottawa 7–3 to put the Senators on the brink of elimination. The Penguins won the series at home in game five, winning 6–2.

Schedule and results

Standings

Regular season

|- style="text-align:center; background:#cfc;"
| 1 ||  19 || 3:00pm || @Winnipeg || 4–1 || Anderson || MTS Centre (15,004) || 1–0–0 || 2
|- style="text-align:center; background:#cfc;"
| 2 ||  21 || 7:30pm || Florida || 4–0 || Anderson || Scotiabank Place (19,952) || 2–0–0 || 4
|- style="text-align:center; background:#cfc;"
| 3 ||  24 || 7:30pm || @Florida || 3–1 || Anderson || BankAtlantic Centre (15,634) || 3–0–0 || 6
|- style="text-align:center; background:#fcf;"
| 4 ||  25 || 7:30pm || @Tampa Bay || 4–6 || Bishop || Tampa Bay Times Forum (19,204) || 3–1–0 || 6
|- style="text-align:center; background:#ffc;"
| 5 ||  27 || 5:00pm || Pittsburgh || 1–2 (SO) || Anderson || Scotiabank Place (20,081) || 3–1–1 || 7
|- style="text-align:center; background:#cfc;"
| 6 ||  29 || 7:30pm || Washington || 3–2 || Anderson || Scotiabank Place (19,267) || 4–1–1 || 9
|- style="text-align:center; background:#cfc;"
| 7 ||  30 || 7:00pm || Montreal || 5–1 || Anderson || Scotiabank Place (19,620) || 5–1–1 || 11
|-

|- style="text-align:center; background:#fcf;"
| 8 ||  1 || 7:00pm || @Carolina || 0–1 || Anderson || PNC Arena (18,680) || 5–2–1 || 11
|- style="text-align:center; background:#fcf;"
| 9 ||  3 || 2:00pm || @Montreal || 1–2 || Anderson || Bell Centre (21,273) || 5–3–1 || 11
|- style="text-align:center; background:#cfc;"
| 10 ||  5 || 7:30pm || Buffalo || 4–3 || Anderson || Scotiabank Place (18,345) || 6–3–1 || 13
|- style="text-align:center; background:#ffc;"
| 11 ||  7 || 7:30pm || Carolina || 2–3 (OT) || Anderson || Scotiabank Place (17,337)  || 6–3–2 || 14
|- style="text-align:center; background:#fcf;"
| 12 ||  9 || 2:00pm || Winnipeg || 0–1 || Bishop || Scotiabank Place (18,594)|| 6–4–2 || 14
|- style="text-align:center; background:#cfc;"
| 13 ||  12 || 7:30pm || Buffalo || 2–0 || Anderson || Scotiabank Place (18,429) || 7–4–2 || 16
|- style="text-align:center; background:#fcf;"
| 14 ||  13 || 7:00pm || @Pittsburgh || 2–4 || Anderson || Consol Energy Center (18,637) || 7–5–2 || 16
|- style="text-align:center; background:#fcf;"
| 15 ||  16 || 7:00pm || @Toronto || 0–3 || Anderson || Air Canada Centre (19,537) || 7–6–2 || 16
|- style="text-align:center; background:#cfc;"
| 16 ||  18 || 1:00pm || @New Jersey || 2–1 (SO) || Bishop || Prudential Center (17,625) || 8–6–2 || 18
|- style="text-align:center; background:#cfc;"
| 17 ||  19 || 7:30pm || NY Islanders || 3–1 || Anderson || Scotiabank Place (18,595)|| 9–6–2 || 20
|- style="text-align:center; background:#cfc;"
| 18 ||  21 || 7:30pm || NY Rangers || 3–2 (SO) || Bishop || Scotiabank Place (19,076) || 10–6–2 || 22
|- style="text-align:center; background:#cfc;"
| 19 ||  23 || 7:00pm || Toronto || 3–2 || Bishop || Scotiabank Place (19,499) || 11–6–2 || 24
|- style="text-align:center; background:#cfc;"
| 20 ||  25 || 7:30pm || Montreal || 2–1 (SO) || Bishop || Scotiabank Place (19,210) || 12–6–2 || 26
|- style="text-align:center; background:#ffc;"
| 21 ||  28 || 7:00pm || @Boston || 1–2 (OT) || Lehner || TD Garden (17,565) || 12–6–3 || 27
|-

|- style="text-align:center; background:#fcf;"
| 22 ||  2 || 12:00pm || @Philadelphia || 1–2 || Bishop || Wells Fargo Center (19,959) || 12–7–3 || 27
|- style="text-align:center; background:#ffc;"
| 23 ||  3 || 3:00pm || @NY Islanders || 2–3 (SO) || Lehner || Nassau Veterans Memorial Coliseum (13,512) || 12–7–4 || 28
|- style="text-align:center; background:#fcf;"
| 24 ||  6 || 7:00pm || @Toronto || 4–5 || Bishop || Air Canada Centre (19,412) || 12–8–4 || 28
|- style="text-align:center; background:#cfc;"
| 25 ||  8 || 7:00pm || @NY Rangers || 3–2 || Lehner || Madison Square Garden (17,200) || 13–8–4 || 30
|- style="text-align:center; background:#ffc;"
| 26 ||  11 || 7:30pm || Boston || 2–3 (SO) || Lehner || Scotiabank Place (20,256) || 13–8–5 || 31
|- style="text-align:center; background:#ffc;"
| 27 ||  13 || 7:00pm || @Montreal || 3–4 (SO) || Lehner || Bell Centre (21,273) || 13–8–6 || 32
|- style="text-align:center; background:#cfc;"
| 28 ||  16 || 3:00pm || @Buffalo || 4–3 (OT) || Bishop || First Niagara Center (19,070) || 14–8–6 || 34
|- style="text-align:center; background:#cfc;"
| 29 ||  17 || 5:00pm || Winnipeg || 4–1 || Lehner || Scotiabank Place (19,227) || 15–8–6 || 36
|- style="text-align:center; background:#cfc;"
| 30 ||  19 || 7:00pm || @NY Islanders || 5–3 || Bishop || Nassau Veterans Memorial Coliseum (10,668) || 16–8–6 || 38
|- style="text-align:center; background:#fcf;"
| 31 ||  21 || 7:30pm || Boston || 1–2 || Lehner || Scotiabank Place (19,603) || 16–9–6 || 38
|- style="text-align:center; background:#cfc;"
| 32 ||  23 || 2:00pm || Tampa Bay || 5–3 || Lehner || Scotiabank Place (20,016) || 17–9–6 || 40
|- style="text-align:center; background:#cfc;"
| 33 ||  25 || 7:30pm || New Jersey || 3–2 (SO) || Bishop || Scotiabank Place (18,902) || 18–9–6 || 42
|- style="text-align:center; background:#cfc;"
| 34 ||  28 || 7:30pm || NY Rangers || 3–0 || Bishop || Scotiabank Place (19,447) || 19–9–6 || 44
|- style="text-align:center; background:#fcf;"
| 35 ||  30 || 7:00pm || Toronto || 0–4 || Bishop || Scotiabank Place (20,183) || 19–10–6 || 44
|-

|- style="text-align:center; background:#fcf;"
| 36 ||  2 || 7:00pm || @Boston || 2–3 || Lehner || TD Garden (17,565) || 19–11–6 || 44
|- style="text-align:center; background:#fcf;"
| 37 ||  5 || 7:00pm || @Buffalo || 2–4 || Lehner || First Niagara Center (19,070) || 19–12–6 || 44
|- style="text-align:center; background:#fcf;"
| 38 ||  7 || 6:00pm || @Florida || 1–2 || Anderson || BankAtlantic Center (15,634)|| 19–13–6 || 44
|- style="text-align:center; background:#fcf;"
| 39 ||  9 || 7:30pm || @Tampa Bay || 2–3 || Anderson || Tampa Bay Times Forum (17,323) || 19–14–6 || 44
|- style="text-align:center; background:#cfc;"
| 40 ||  11 || 7:00pm || @Philadelphia || 3–1 || Lehner || Wells Fargo Center (19,598) || 20–14–6 || 46
|- style="text-align:center; background:#cfc;"
| 41 ||  12 || 7:00pm || @New Jersey || 2–0 || Anderson || Prudential Center (16,099) || 21–14–6 || 48
|-  style="text-align:center; background:#ccc;"
| – || 15 || 7:00pm || @Boston ||colspan="4" | Game rescheduled to April 28 due to the Boston Marathon bombing. ||
|- style="text-align:center; background:#cfc;"
| 42 ||  16 || 7:30pm || Carolina || 3–2 || Anderson || Scotiabank Place (19,181) || 22–14–6 || 50
|- style="text-align:center; background:#cfc;"
| 43 ||  18 || 7:30pm || Washington || 3–1 || Anderson || Scotiabank Place (19,965) || 23–14–6 || 52
|- style="text-align:center; background:#fcf;"
| 44 ||  20 || 7:00pm || Toronto || 1–4 || Anderson || Scotiabank Place (20,500) || 23–15–6 || 52
|- style="text-align:center; background:#fcf;"
| 45 ||  22 || 7:30pm || Pittsburgh || 1–3 || Anderson || Scotiabank Place (20,276) || 23–16–6 || 52
|- style="text-align:center; background:#cfc;"
| 46 ||  25 || 7:00pm || @Washington || 2–1 (OT) || Anderson || Verizon Center (18,506) || 24–16–6 || 54
|- style="text-align:center; background:#fcf;"
| 47 ||  27 || 7:00pm || Philadelphia || 1–2 || Anderson || Scotiabank Place (20,232) || 24–17–6 || 54
|- style="text-align:center; background:#cfc;"
| 48 || 28 || 7:00pm || @Boston || 4–2 || Lehner || TD Garden (17,565) || 25–17–6 || 56
|-

|- style="text-align:center;"
| Legend:       = Win       = Loss       = OT/SO Loss

Playoffs

| # || Date || Visitor || Score || Home || OT || Ottawa goals || Montreal goals || Decision || Attendance || Series || Recap
|- style="text-align:center; background:#cfc;"
|1||May 2 || Ottawa Senators || 4–2 || Montreal Canadiens || || Karlsson, Silfverberg, Methot, Latendresse || Bourque, Gallagher || Anderson || 21,273 || 1–0|| 
|- style="text-align:center; background:#fcf;"
|2||May 3 || Ottawa Senators || 1–3 || Montreal Canadiens || || Michalek || White, Gallagher, Ryder || Anderson || 21,273 || 1–1 || 
|- style="text-align:center; background:#cfc;"
|3||May 5 || Montreal Canadiens || 1–6 || Ottawa Senators || || Alfredsson, Pageau (3), Silfverberg, Turris || Bourque || Anderson || 20,249 || 2–1 || 
|- style="text-align:center; background:#cfc;"
|4||May 7 || Montreal Canadiens || 2–3 || Ottawa Senators || OT || Zibanejad, Conacher, Turris || Subban, Galchenyuk || Anderson || 20,500 || 3–1 || 
|-  style="text-align:center; background:#cfc;"
|5||May 9 || Ottawa Senators || 6–1 || Montreal Canadiens || || Smith, Conacher (2), Turris, Alfredsson, Condra || Subban || Anderson || 21,273 || 4–1 || 
|-

| # || Date || Visitor || Score || Home || OT || Ottawa goals || Pittsburgh goals || Decision || Attendance || Series || Recap
|- style="text-align:center; background:#fcf;"
|1||May 14 || Ottawa Senators || 1–4 || Pittsburgh Penguins || || Greening || Martin, Malkin, Kunitz, Dupuis || Anderson || 18,621 || 0–1 || 
|- style="text-align:center; background:#fcf;"
|2||May 17 || Ottawa Senators || 3–4 || Pittsburgh Penguins || || Turris, Greening, Pageau || Crosby (3), Morrow || Lehner || 18,645 || 0–2 || 
|- style="text-align:center; background:#cfc;"
|3||May 19 || Pittsburgh Penguins || 1–2 || Ottawa Senators || 2OT  || Alfredsson, Greening || Kennedy || Anderson || 20,500 ||  1–2 || 
|- style="text-align:center; background:#fcf;"
|4||May 22 ||Pittsburgh Penguins || 7–3 || Ottawa Senators ||  || Michalek, Turris, Alfredsson || Neal (2), Kunitz, Iginla (2), Dupuis, Crosby|| Anderson || 20,500 || 1–3 || 
|- style="text-align:center; background:#fcf;"
|5||May 24 || Ottawa Senators || 2–6 || Pittsburgh Penguins || || Michalek, Turris  || Morrow, Neal (3), Letang, Malkin || Anderson || 18,656 || 1–4 || 
|-

|- style="text-align:center;"
| Legend:       = Win       = Loss      

 Scorer of game-winning goal in italics

Player statistics
Final stats
Scoring

Goaltenders

†Denotes player spent time with another team before joining the Senators.  Stats reflect time with the Senators only.
‡Traded mid-season
Bold/italics denotes franchise record

Awards/milestones
 Molson Cup – Craig Anderson
 Jack Adams Award (coach of the year) – Paul MacLean
 Mark Messier Leadership Award – Daniel Alfredsson

Transactions

Trades

Free agents signed

Free agents lost

Claimed via waivers

Lost via waivers

Player signings

Draft picks

Ottawa Senators' picks at the 2012 NHL Entry Draft, held in Pittsburgh, Pennsylvania, on June 22–23, 2012.

Draft notes
 The Senators' second-round pick went to the Phoenix Coyotes as the result of a December 17, 2011, trade that sent Kyle Turris to the Senators in exchange for David Rundblad and this pick.
  The Nashville Predators' third-round pick went to the Senators as a result of a February 10, 2011, trade that sent Mike Fisher to the Predators in exchange for this pick.

See also 
 2012–13 NHL season

References

Ottawa Senators seasons
Ottawa Senators season, 2012-13
Ottawa